James Sebesta (born August 24, 1935) is an American politician. He served as a Republican member of the Florida Senate from 1998 to 2006. He previously served as Hillsborough County Supervisor of Elections from 1970 to 1974.

References

1935 births
Living people
People from Pontiac, Illinois
People from Tampa, Florida
Republican Party Florida state senators